Full Circle is an American television miniseries written by Ed Solomon and directed by Steven Soderbergh for HBO Max.

Plot
An investigation into a botched robbery in New York City.

Cast
 Zazie Beetz
 Claire Danes as Sam
 Timothy Olyphant as Derek
 Dennis Quaid
 Jharrel Jerome
 Sheyi Cole
 CCH Pounder
 Jim Gaffigan
 William Sadler
 Happy Anderson
 Adia

Episodes

Production
On June 17, 2021, it was reported that HBO Max was set to develop the series Full Circle with Ed Solomon writing and producing the series with Casey Silver and Steven Soderbergh, who would direct the 6-episode series. In September 2022, Zazie Beetz, Claire Danes, Timothy Olyphant, Dennis Quaid, Jharrel Jerome, Sheyi Cole, CCH Pounder, and Jim Gaffigan were cast. In October 2022, William Sadler, Happy Anderson, and Adia joined the cast.

Filming for the series began in September 2022 in New York City.

References

External links
 

HBO Max original programming
English-language television shows
Upcoming television series
Works by Ed Solomon